"Pass & Move (It's the Liverpool Groove)" was a single released by the English football team Liverpool on 6 May 1996, ahead of their FA Cup final clash with Manchester United.  It reached number 4 in the UK Singles Chart.

References

1996 singles
Liverpool F.C. songs
1996 songs
Song articles with missing songwriters